The 2011 Omega Mission Hills World Cup was a golf tournament that took place 24–27 November on the Blackstone course at Mission Hills Haikou in Hainan, China. It was the 56th World Cup, and the first since 2009, when the tournament switched to being staged biennially. 28 countries competed as two player teams. The purse was increased from $5.5 million in 2009 to $7.5 million in 2011. The event was won by the United States, represented by Matt Kuchar and Gary Woodland with a score of 264, 24 under par.

Qualification and format
The leading 18 available players from different countries in the Official World Golf Ranking  qualified automatically on 18 July. These 18 players then selected a player from their country to compete with them. The person they picked had to be ranked within the top 100 on the Official World Golf Ranking as of 1 September. If there was no other player from that country within the top 100 then the next highest ranked player would be their partner. If there was no other available player from that country within the top 500, then the exempt player could choose whoever he wanted as long as they are a professional from the same country. A further nine countries qualified via three qualifying stages, held in Malaysia, Estonia and Venezuela. The final team was the host nation, China.

The 18 qualifying players (together with their country and World Ranking on 18 July) were Martin Kaymer (Germany, ranked 3), Rory McIlroy (Ireland, 4), Matt Kuchar (USA, 8), Charl Schwartzel (South Africa, 12), Ian Poulter (England, 16), Robert Karlsson (Sweden, 19), Francesco Molinari (Italy, 23), Álvaro Quirós (Spain, 24), Martin Laird (Scotland, 26), Anders Hansen (Denmark, 41), Raphaël Jacquelin (France, 69), Yuta Ikeda (Japan, 70), Brendan Jones (Australia, 73), Nicolas Colsaerts (Belgium, 75), Camilo Villegas (Colombia, 78), Jamie Donaldson (Wales, 98), Thongchai Jaidee (Thailand, 101) and Brendon de Jonge (Zimbabwe, 106). South Korea, Fiji and Argentina would have qualified automatically had their leading players chosen to play.

The event was a 72-hole stroke play team event with each team consisting of two players. The first and third days were fourball play and the second and final days were foursomes play.

Teams
The table below lists the teams together with their World Ranking (if any) at the time of the tournament.

The tournament included three pairs of brothers: the Villegas brothers representing Colombia, the Molinari brothers representing Italy and the Santos brothers representing Portugal.

Result
Australia led after the first round with a better-ball score of 61. Ireland and Scotland were in joint second place with 63, followed by The Netherlands and United States with 64.

After the second round foursomes, Australia and Ireland were joint leaders at 131. Scotland were third at 132, followed by Spain, New Zealand and United States at 134.

Ireland led by two shots at the end of the third day with a total of 195 after a better-ball score of 64. Germany, South Africa and United States were tied for second at 197 with Australia fifth at 198. Germany and South Africa had the best scores of the day with 61.

The United States had a last round foursome score of 67 to win by two shots over England and Germany. Ireland had a last round 72 to drop to a tie for fourth place.

Source

Notes

References

External links
Official site

World Cup (men's golf)
Golf tournaments in China
Sport in Hainan
World Cup (men's)
World Cup golf
World Cup golf